Americana is an album by English rock musician Ray Davies, released by Legacy Recordings in April 2017. Like Davies' 2013 book of the same name, it explores his lifelong fascination with the music and culture of the United States, and his experiences of touring and living there. The album features contributions from members of American country rock band the Jayhawks.

Background
Although thought of as a quintessentially British songwriter, Ray Davies grew up fascinated by American music and cinema. The Kinks, the band he formed with his brother Dave, were initially heavily influenced by American musical styles, particularly rhythm and blues. When a permit refusal imposed by the American Federation of Musicians effectively banned the Kinks from touring the United States between 1965 and 1969, Davies began to focus his songwriting on more British themes, resulting in albums such as The Kinks Are the Village Green Preservation Society (1968) and Arthur (Or the Decline and Fall of the British Empire) (1969). Following the lifting of the ban and their return to the US, the Kinks released the country rock-tinged Muswell Hillbillies (1971), with Davies' writing exploring the influences of American culture on his North London upbringing.

Davies' US connections were strengthened when the Kinks successfully reinvented themselves as an arena rock act, extensively touring North America in the late 1970s and early 1980s. He also briefly lived in New York City during that era. Following the Kinks' break-up in the 1990s, Davies settled in New Orleans, where in 2004 he was shot in the leg following an altercation with a mugger. In 2013, he published his memoir Americana: The Kinks, the Road and the Perfect Riff, looking back on these experiences and his complex relationship with America.

Recording
Following the release of the book, Davies decided to expand the Americana project with an accompanying album, his first of new solo material since Working Man's Café in 2007. The album was recorded at the Kinks' Konk studios in Hornsey, London, with American country rock group the Jayhawks as Davies' backing band. Jayhawks keyboard player Karen Grotberg duets with Davies on "Message From the Road" and "A Place in Your Heart". The album was produced and arranged by Davies himself, with co-producers Guy Massey and John Jackson. The album was released in 2017. It reached number 15 on the UK charts and 79 in the US.

In the sessions for Americana, Davies recorded sufficient material for a follow-up album. The album Our Country: Americana Act II was released separately in 2018 and reached number 58 on the UK charts.

Critical reception

At Metacritic, which assigns a normalised rating out of 100 to reviews from critics, Americana received an average score of 80, indicating "generally favourable reviews", based on 19 critics. In his review for AllMusic, Stephen Thomas Erlewine says, "What makes it last are the songs, which are wry, moving, and truthful, which wasn't always the case in his book". Classic Rock described the album as "a resounding success" with Davies "in terrific, matchless voice", while American Songwriter said it was a "first class offering ... and a worthy entry into Ray Davies’ rightfully esteemed catalog". A more negative review in The Guardian described the songs as "weedy" and "naff", likening the album to "an Alan Partridge-presented country happy hour".

Track listing

Personnel
Musicians
 Ray Davies – lead vocals, guitars, piano, backing vocals, percussion, spoken word, dropped beer glasses and broken tea cups
 Bill Shanley – acoustic guitars, electric guitars, backing vocals
 Gary Louris – acoustic guitars, electric guitars, backing vocals
 Marc Perlman – bass, backing vocals
 Tim O'Reagan – drums, backing vocals, percussion
 Karen Grotberg – piano, keyboards, lead vocals, backing vocals
 John Jackson – mandolin, violin, acoustic guitars, electric guitars, 12-string guitar, backing vocals, percussion

Technical personnel
 Ray Davies – producer, arranger
 Guy Massey – co-producer, recording and mixing
 John Jackson – co-producer
 Josh Green – recording and mixing
 Bob Ludwig – mastering

References

2017 albums
Ray Davies albums
Albums produced by Ray Davies
Legacy Recordings albums